Easton is a town in northeast Marathon County, Wisconsin, United States. It is part of the Wausau, Wisconsin Metropolitan Statistical Area. The population was 1,111 at the 2010 census. The unincorporated communities of Johnson and Kalinke are located in the town. The unincorporated community of Sunset is also located partially in the town.

Geography

Demographics
At the 2000 census there were 1,062 people, 383 households, and 312 families in the town. The population density was 24.7 people per square mile (9.5/km). There were 400 housing units at an average density of 9.3 per square mile (3.6/km).  The racial makeup of the town was 97.36% White, 0.09% African American, 1.22% Asian, 1.04% from other races, and 0.28% from two or more races. Hispanic or Latino of any race were 1.04%.

Of the 383 households 34.5% had children under the age of 18 living with them, 74.7% were married couples living together, 2.9% had a female householder with no husband present, and 18.5% were non-families. 16.2% of households were one person and 6.8% were one person aged 65 or older. The average household size was 2.77 and the average family size was 3.11.

The age distribution was 26.2% under the age of 18, 5.6% from 18 to 24, 31.3% from 25 to 44, 25.2% from 45 to 64, and 11.8% 65 or older. The median age was 38 years. For every 100 females, there were 112.8 males. For every 100 females age 18 and over, there were 111.3 males.

The median household income was $49,722 and the median family income  was $50,938. Males had a median income of $32,054 versus $21,857 for females. The per capita income for the town was $26,587. About 2.2% of families and 2.6% of the population were below the poverty line, including 2.4% of those under age 18 and 4.6% of those age 65 or over.

References

Towns in Marathon County, Wisconsin
Towns in Wisconsin